Riccardo Daga (born 13 January 2000) is an Italian footballer who plays as a goalkeeper for  club Messina.

Career
In July 2019, Daga moved to Serie C club Arezzo on a free transfer. He made his league debut for the club on 18 September 2019 in a 2–1 defeat to Juventus II.

On 7 September 2020, he signed a 2-year contract with Viterbese. On 28 January 2022, he moved on loan to Monterosi.

On 19 August 2022, Daga joined Messina.

References

External links
Riccardo Daga at SofaScore

2000 births
Living people
Sportspeople from Cagliari
Italian footballers
Association football goalkeepers
Serie C players
Cagliari Calcio players
S.S. Arezzo players
U.S. Viterbese 1908 players
Monterosi Tuscia F.C. players
A.C.R. Messina players